15th Rifle Division can refer to:

15th Guards Rifle Division
15th Rifle Division (Soviet Union)
51st Guards Mechanized Brigade (Ukraine), formerly the 15th Guards Rifle Division